The ladder approach is a lifesaving technique taught by Lifesaving Society and is used to promote the safety of a rescuer during an aquatic rescue. The approach stresses using the least dangerous method possible during a rescue, and moving on to more dangerous options if it becomes necessary to do so.  This method can help keep the rescuer as safe as possible throughout the rescue.

The ladder approach
(Bottom of the ladder)
Talk - Try to talk the victim to safety- see if they can help themselves.
Throw - Throw an aid to the victim
Reach - Reach with an aid to try to help the victim 
Wade - Wade into the water and provide aid to the victim
Row - Row out to the victim and help them into your boat/provide them with an aid
Swim - Swim out to the victim and provide them with an aid
Tow - Swim out to the victim and tow them back to safety using an aid 
Carry - Using direct physical contact, remove the victim from danger
(Top of the ladder)

References

External links
Lifesaving Society
Lifesaving Society Ontario
International Life Saving Federation

Surf lifesaving